Slotermeer is a neighborhood of Amsterdam, Netherlands. It is divided in Slotermeer Northeast and Slotermeer Southwest. The center of Slotermeer is located in the area surrounding Plein '40-'45.

Amsterdam Nieuw-West
Neighbourhoods of Amsterdam